Qeshlaq-e Piranlu (also Romanized as Qeshlāq-e Pīrānlū; also known as Pīrānlū) is a village in Keyvan Rural District, in the Central District of Khoda Afarin County, East Azerbaijan Province, Iran. At the 2006 census, its population was 35, in 8 families.

References 

Populated places in Khoda Afarin County